John, Jack, Johnny, Jon, or Jonathan Dunn may refer to:

Entertainment
John Dunn (pipemaker) (c. 1764–1820), inventor of keyed Northumbrian smallpipes
John Dunn (actor) born O'Donoghue (1813–1875), Australian comic actor
John Millard Dunn (1865–1936), organist and choirmaster
John Dunn (violinist) (1866–1940), English violinist
Johnny Dunn (1897–1937), American jazz trumpeter
Jon Dunn (musician), American musician
John Dunn (software developer) (born 1943), American musician and art software developer
John Dunn (animator) (1919–1983), cartoon writer for DePatie-Freleng and Looney Tunes
John W. Dunn (painter) (1891–1975), American painter
John Dunn (radio presenter) (1934–2004), BBC Radio 2 DJ

Politics
John Henry Dunn (1792–1854), businessman and political figure in Canada West
John Dunn Jr. (assemblyman) (1827–1909), Wisconsin politician
John T. Dunn (1838–1907), U.S. Representative from New Jersey
John Dunn Jr. (1830–1892), South Australia politician
John Freeman Dunn (1874–1954), English banker and stockbroker, barrister and Liberal Party politician
John Dunn (1820–1860), British Conservative politician

Religion
John Woodham Dunn (1812–1883), Anglican vicar of Warkworth, Northumberland
John Joseph Dunn (1870–1933), American prelate of the Catholic Church

Sports
Jack Dunn (baseball) (1872–1928), minor league baseball owner and manager
John Dunn (cricketer) (1862–1892), English cricketer 
John Dunn (footballer, born 1888) (1888–1968), English football inside right
John Dunn (footballer, born 1944), English footballer for Aston Villa and Charlton Athletic
Jack Dunn (footballer, born 1994), English football player
Johnny Dunn (footballer) (1881–1947), Australian rules footballer for Collingwood
Jon Dunn (born 1981), American football player
John Dunn (rower), American rower at the 1976 World Rowing Championships
Jack Dunn (soccer), American soccer player
Jack Dunn (figure skater) (1917–1938), British figure skater
John Dunn (Australian rules footballer)
John Dunn (American football), American football coach and former player

Other
John Dunn (miller) (1802–1894), flour miller, parliamentarian, and philanthropist in South Australia
John Ainsworth Dunn (1831–1915), furniture manufacturer in Massachusetts
John Robert Dunn (1833–1895), Scottish settler in South Africa
John Dunn (bushranger) (1846–1866), Australian bush ranger
John Dunn (explorer) (born 1954), explorer of the Canadian Arctic
John "Pudgy" Dunn (1896–1937), St. Louis gangster
John M. Dunn (1910–1949), American mobster, executed in 1949
John Dunn (political theorist) (born 1940), professor of political theory at the University of Cambridge
John Dunn (university president) (born 1945), president of Western Michigan University
John Asher Dunn, American linguist
John W. Dunn (architect), American architect
Jon Michael Dunn (1941–2021), American educator
John Thomas Dunn (chemist) (1858–1939), English chemist

See also
John Donne (1572–1631), English poet, satirist, lawyer and priest
John Dunne (disambiguation)
Dunn (surname)